Quantcast is an American technology company, founded in 2006, that specializes in AI-driven real-time advertising, audience insights and measurement. It has offices in the United States, Canada, Australia, Singapore, United Kingdom, Ireland, France, Germany, Italy, and Sweden.

History
Quantcast was launched in 2006. The company was built on the belief that digital advertising requires reliable data to be successful. Initially the primary aim was to gather detailed, real-time insights on audience characteristics across the internet. By placing tags on digital content across the open internet, the firm measures metrics such as audience age and gender makeup, areas of interest and type, length and frequency of their engagement with certain types of content. This private information is made publicly available to be used by marketers and publishers to accurately understand their audience in granular detail.

In 2010, Quantcast's Publisher Program was the first syndicated online traffic measurement service to receive official accreditation from the Media Rating Council (MRC).

In 2013, the company acquired MakeGood Software, an advertising technology startup that simplifies data management and reporting for online advertising campaigns. The technology was subsequently integrated with Quantcast Advertise to enhance the reporting functions available for Quantcast campaigns. This nudged the company closer towards competition in the ad effectiveness category, which includes companies like comScore.

In 2021, Quantcast unveiled the Quantcast Platform, a self-service intelligent audience platform for brands, agencies, and publishers to advertise on the open internet.

In 2021, Quantcast announced the launch of a new educational program, the Quantcast Academy, a self-paced, online training program that provides learning and certification in digital advertising.

In 2021, Quantcast revealed a cookieless solution for the Quantcast Platform.

Recognition
2013 OnMedia 100 Top Private Companies - B2B: Advertising Analytics
2012 WIRED Magazine: The 10 San Francisco Tech Companies You Wish You Worked For
2012 AlwaysOn Global 250 Top Private Companies
2011 OnMedia 100 Top Private Companies - B2B: Advertising Analytics
2011 Business Insider Digital 100: Quantcast Ranked #54
2010 Fast Company Most Innovative Companies - Web
2015 Glassdoor Employee's Choice Award, Best Places to Work
2016 Quantcast partnered with IAB Europe, IAB UK and the ANAs to create an educational program for industry professionals to understand the language, tools, and processes of the online advertising ecosystem.
2016 Business Insider: The 37 hottest pre-IPO ad tech startups of 2016. Ranked #11.
2021 MarTech Breakthrough Awards: Quantcast won “Best Web Analytics Solution” for Quantcast Measure
2021 Best in Biz Awards North America: Quantcast Platform named a silver winner in the “Best New Product of the Year” category
2021 Human Rights Campaign Foundation: Best Places to Work for LGBTQ Equality
2022 Human Rights Campaign Foundation: Best Places to Work for LGBTQ+ Equality
2022 Built In Honors Quantcast in its Esteemed 2022 Best Places To Work Awards

References

External links
 

Digital marketing companies of the United States
Market research companies of the United States
Companies based in San Francisco
Web analytics
Web log analysis software
American companies established in 2006